A press camera is a medium or large format view camera that was predominantly used by press photographers in the early to mid-20th century. It was largely replaced for press photography by 35mm film cameras in the 1960s, and subsequently, by digital cameras. The quintessential press camera was the Speed Graphic. Press cameras are still used as portable and rugged view cameras.

Details
Press cameras were widely used from the 1900s through the early 1960s and commonly have the following features:

 collapsible into strong, compact boxes
 flexible bellows, attached to a flatbed track 
 easily interchangeable lenses, mounted on a solid support
 ability to accept sheet film, film packs, and roll film, through the use of interchangeable film backs and holders
 ground glass focusing screen
 optical viewfinder
 handheld operation 
 reduced number, reduced range or absence of movements, in contrast to field cameras or other view camera formats
 optical rangefinder focusing in some models
 Flash-synchronized internal iris lens shutter

Some models have both a focal plane shutter and an iris lens shutter. The focal plane shutter allows for fast shutter speeds and the use of lenses which do not have an integral shutter (known as a barrel lens), while the iris shutter allows for flash synchronization at any speed. The Graphlex Speed Graphic models  and the Ihagee Zweiverschluss ("two shutters") Duplex are examples of press cameras that had both focal plane and iris shutters.

The most common sheet film size for press cameras was the 4×5 inch film format. Models have also been produced for the 2.25×3.25 inch format (6×9 cm), 3.25×4.25 inch format and various 120 film formats  from 6×6 cm. through 6×12 cm. European press cameras, such as the Goerz and Van Neck, used the 9×12cm format, marginally smaller than the 4"×5" format.

The press camera is still used as a portable medium or large format film camera for photojournalism and among fine art photographers who use it as a low cost, more portable alternative to a view camera.  In news photography, the press camera has been largely supplanted by the smaller formats of 120 film and 135 film, and more recently by digital cameras. The advantage of the 4×5 inch format over 35 mm format is that the size of the film negative is 16 times that of a 35 mm film negative image. 
 
Press cameras were largely superseded by the 6x6cm medium format Rolleiflex in the early to mid-1960s and later by 35 mm rangefinder or single-lens reflex cameras. The smaller formats gained acceptance as film technology advanced and quality of the smaller negatives was deemed acceptable by picture editors. The smaller cameras generally offered lenses with faster maximum apertures and by the nature of their smaller size, were easier to transport and use. The bulk and weight of the camera itself, as well as the size of the film holders (two pictures per film holder), limited the number of exposures photographers could make on an assignment; this was less of an issue with 12 exposures on a roll of 120 film, or 36 exposures on 35 mm film.

Compared to view cameras, press cameras do not have the range of swing/tilt movements of the front standard, and rarely have back movements because many were fitted with focal plane shutters.

List of press cameras

 Beseler
 Beseler 4×5
 Burke & James Press, Burke & James Inc., Chicago, U.S.A.
 B & J Press (4×5)
 Watson (2×3)
 Busch Pressman
 Model C (2×3)
 Model D (4×5)
 Tower Press (2×3, 4×5) = Sears Tower branded Busch Pressman 
Goerz Anschutz
Ango series
 Graflex, the classic American press camera
 Speed Graphic (3¼×4¼, 4×5")
 Miniature Speed Graphic (2¼x3¼")
 Crown Graphic (3¼×4¼, 4×5")
 Miniature Crown Graphic (2¼x3¼")
 Century Graphic (2¼x3¼")
 Super Crown Graphic (4×5")
 Super Speed Graphic (4×5")
Pacemaker Speed Graphic (2¼x3¼, 3¼×4¼, 4×5")
Pacemaker Crown Graphic (2¼x3¼, 3¼×4¼, 4×5")
Ihagee
Zweiverschluss Duplex (6.5x9 cm, 9x12 cm and 10x15 cm)
 Kalart Press (3×4)
 Linhof
 Super Technika
 Linhof Technika Press, model of both Graflex XL and Mamiya Press
 Linhof Press 70
 Linhof Press (4×5) = Technika III with limited movements
 Mamiya
 Mamiya Press
 Mamiya Universal
 Meridan 45 (A, B, maybe C)
 Micro Precision Products
 MPP MicroPress—English design focal plane shutter camera from 1950s, based on Speed Graphic model with the rangefinder mounted horizontally at the top
 Omega
 Koni Omega
 Rapid Omega
 Plaubel Makina
 Polaroid
 Polaroid 600/600 SE
 Press King, B&W Manufacturing Co., Ontario, Canada
 Ramlose Model A (4×5)
 Thornton-Pickard,
 Topcon
 Topcon Horseman (2¼ x 3¼) Models 760, 960, 970, 980, 986, VH and VHR
 Toyo Super Graphic (4×5)
 Van Neck,
 Wista 45RF

See also
 View camera
 Field camera
 Speed Graphic
 Weegee

Notes

References

External links
Graflex cameras
The MPP Users Club – cameras and photographic equipment manufactured by Micro Precision Products Ltd. of London, England.
Jo Lommen's site about Classic Press Cameras
The Meridian 45B
'Must See: He Kept His Speed Graphic' By Kerri Macdonald' on Louis Mendes, New York Times Lens Blog
Collection of presscameras
Using press cameras
– View and field cameras of the United States: 1870s-1930s

Cameras by type